Hiranandani Gardens (known popularly as Hiranandani) is an upmarket township consisting of condominiums, penthouses, bungalows and commercial complexes in Powai in the city of Mumbai. Hiranandani was constructed by the Hiranandani Group and can be accessed by JVLR from the North and LBS Marg from the South.

Hiranandani consists of residential buildings, office buildings, hospital, schools, gardens, community centre, sports club, banks, shopping malls, film studio, bus garage, hotels, restaurants, pubs and swimming pools. Spread in an area of 250 acres, the township houses 42 residential buildings and 23 commercial buildings with a building falling under SEZ category (Kensington).

Hiranandani Gardens is also accorded as Mumbai's start-up and outsourcing hub. Hiranandani Gardens houses several startup companies, Investment banking firms, Venture capital firms and BPOs.

History
In 1986, the Hiranandani group signed a tripartite agreement between the group, Maharashtra state and the MMRDA for developing 230 acres of land and for constructing affordable housing. As per the contract, the real estate developer was to construct apartments measuring 430 ft2 and 861 ft2 (50% each) as "Medium Income Group Homes" (affordable housing).

Construction started in 1989 and the area then was barren and hilly. The area lacked basic infrastructure such as roads, sanitary sewer lines, water or electrical connections. Along with developing the basic infrastructure, more than 100,000 trees were also planted. In the late 1990s, the construction and the architecture strategy was changed from "affordable" to upmarket housing and the neoclassical architecture was adapted as theme for upcoming buildings. By the mid 1990s, a shopping mall (Galleria) was constructed at the geographical center of the township.

Landmarks

Supreme Business Park
Supreme Business Park is an executive business centre in Mumbai offer fully furnished serviced office space with all facilities, business address at prime location, commercial office space, virtual office, meeting rooms and HD conferencing rooms in Mumbai. Supreme Business Park is located in Powai, Mumbai. Powai is well connected through the 6-lane Jogeshwari – Vikhroli Link Road linked strategically to the two crucial arteries of Mumbai, the Western and Eastern Express Highways.

Galleria
In the 1990s, Hiranandani group constructed Galleria shopping complex in the township. This shopping complex epitomises the Galleria Vittorio Emanuele II in Milan. Situated at the center of the township, the shopping complex is constructed in two floors and houses banks, parking lot, food court, restaurants, pubs and several shops. The Galleria is a tourist attraction and several movies, commercials, TV serials and songs have been filmed here.

Garden and parks
Hiranandani Gardens houses several gardens and parks; the main garden being "Hiranandani Gardens" (township named after this garden) situated on the intersection of Orchard Avenue and High Street – opposite Hiranandani Foundation School. Other prominent gardens are Heritage Garden (on the Cliff avenue), Nirvana Park (on intersection of Central Avenue and JVLR) and Glen Society Garden (in the compound of the Glen Society on Cliff avenue).

Scorpio House
Scorpio House is situated opposite Galleria and houses the headquarters of Scorpio Marine Management India Pvt. Ltd. Constructed in 1995, the building is spread over 65,000 square feet. This building was earlier called Bayer House and was the headquarter of Bayer India limited from 1995 to 2013. Bayer India sought to sell the building in 2002 as well but the sale did not take place due to pricing issues. In 2012, Bayer India acquired 165,000 square feet office space in Hiranandani Estate in Thane and shifted its India HQ to the new location.

Central Avenue
Central Avenue is the main street in Hiranandani Gardens. It starts from JVLR in North and runs for 1.5 kilometres south-west to MHADA colony. The central avenue houses landmarks such as Galleria, Scorpio House, CRISIL House and Powai Plaza. Supermarkets (D-Mart and Haiko Super Market), hotels (Rodas and "Meluha The Fern"), several restaurants, pubs, coffee shops, banks and offices are also situated on this road.

CRISIL House
CRISIL House is situated on the Central Avenue, opposite D-Mart. Constructed in 2010, the building spreads over 211,610 square feet and houses the headquarters of CRISIL (Credit Rating Information Services of India Limited). CRISIL house is a green building and claims to reduce electricity consumption by 40% and water consumption by 30%.

Hiranandani Hospital
Situated on the Hill Side Avenue, Hiranandani Hospital was constructed and is operated by Hiranandani Group. The hospital started operations in February 2004 and is the first hospital in western India to receive the National Accreditation Board for Hospitals & Healthcare Providers accreditation.

Hiranandani Knowledge Park
Hiranandani Knowledge Park is situated opposite the Hiranandani Hospital and houses IFCAI Business School. The school offers bachelor's (BBA), master's (MBA) and doctoral (PhD) degrees in Business administration and management.

The Japanese School of Mumbai, serving Mumbai's Japanese families, is located in the Hiranandani Knowledge Park.

The SDA Bocconi Asia Center, Mumbai, serving as SDA Bocconi School of management, Italy's Pan Asian Hub since 2012 for delivering Executive Education and Postgraduate Programs to the Indian & International Students

Schools
Hiranandani Foundation School is situated on the intersection of Orchard avenue and High street – opposite Hiranandani Gardens (the garden). Established in 1990, the school follows the Indian Certificate of Secondary Education (ICSE) curriculum and the International Baccalaureate (IB) teaching programs. It offers schooling for students from nursery to twelfth grade. Apart from the Hiranandani Foundation School Powai, there is also Bunts Sangha S. M. Shetty school and IIT Bombay in the vicinity. This institute follows the SSC and HSC educational programs. They have classes from Kindergarten all the way up to Masters programs.

Governance
Although Hiranandani Gardens comes under the Brihanmumbai Municipal Corporation jurisdiction, it is the Hiranandani group that undertakes the cleanliness and road repair work of the area. The township is a part of the Mumbai North Central Lok Sabha constituency and Chandivali assembly constituency.

Location
Hiranandani Gardens is located in the geographic center of Mumbai city. Hiranandani Gardens is 8 kilometres north-east of Mumbai airport, 35 kilometres north of Colaba, 28 kilometres north-west of Navi Mumbai and 22 kilometres south-east of Dahisar check-naka.

Transportation
Hiranandani Gardens is not serviced by Mumbai Suburban Railway and by Mumbai Metro. Kanjurmarg railway station is the closest Mumbai Suburban railway station (4 kilometres North-East) whereas closest Mumbai Metro station is Saki Naka metro station (5 kilometres south-west). Jogeshwari–Vikhroli Link Road is the main arterial road serving the township from North and LBS marg serving the township from the South-side. Western and Eastern Express Highways are the main highways in proximity (8 kilometres west and 5 kilometres east respectively from Hiranandani Gardens). Hiranandani Gardens has regular connectivity by BEST. Closest airport is Chhatrapati Shivaji International Airport.

In popular culture
Many Bollywood films, songs, TV commercials and documentaries are shot in Hiranandani Gardens. Some of the popular films shot in Hiranandani Gardens are Haseena Maan Jaayegi (1999), Taal (1999), Kaho Naa... Pyaar Hai (2000), Shakti: The Power (2002), Aankhen (2002), Chalte Chalte (2003), Khushi (2003), Kalyug (2005), Ghajini (2008), and Slumdog Millionaire (2008).

See also

Hiranandani Estate
Powai
Niranjan Hiranandani

References

Neighbourhoods in Mumbai
1989 establishments in Maharashtra